Marian B. Towne (December 6, 1880 – February 16, 1966) was an American politician of the Democratic Party who was the first woman to serve in the Oregon House of Representatives. She was elected to that office in 1914, serving until 1917. Towne was born in Sterlingville, Oregon and died in Phoenix, Oregon.

See also
 Kathryn Clarke (politician), first female Oregon State Senator

External links
 

1880 births
1966 deaths
Democratic Party members of the Oregon House of Representatives
People from Jackson County, Oregon
Women state legislators in Oregon
20th-century American politicians
20th-century American women politicians
People from Phoenix, Oregon